Pursuant to Article 54 of the Law on Internal Regulations of the Islamic Consultative Assembly (Parliament of the Islamic Republic of Iran), the Industries and Mines Commission of the Islamic Consultative Assembly is formed to perform its assigned duties in the fields of industries, post, telecommunications, mines, petrochemical, aerospace and communications industries in accordance with the provisions of the regulation.

Some of the responsibilities of this commission are:

 Experimental review and approval of plans and bills, as well as permanent approval of the statutes of governmental, government-affiliated organizations, companies and institutions
 Review of the work of ministers and officials related to the industrial and mining system of the country
 Research and inspection in major industries of the country
 Investigating the status of road and urban planning issues, public transport fleet, issues of oil and gas and petrochemical industries, issues of country's mines
 Take appropriate measures to support domestic production
 Taking measures to regulate import and export of goods and to organizing different markets of the country
 Review and approval of economic and industrial plans to improve the country's manufacturing industries
 Review and approval of useful plans to improve the country's petrochemical, gas and oil industry
 Review and approval of plans to regulate and improve the country's mines and its related markets

Members 
The members of the Industries and Mines Commission of the Islamic Consultative Assembly in the second year of the 11th term of the Assembly are as follows:

See also 
 Program, Budget and Accounting Commission of the Islamic Consultative Assembly
 Education, Research and Technology Commission of the Islamic Consultative Assembly
 Social Commission of the Islamic Consultative Assembly
 Health and Medical Commission of the Islamic Consultative Assembly
 Internal Affairs of the Country and Councils Commission of the Islamic Consultative Assembly
 Civil Commission of the Islamic Consultative Assembly
 Special Commission of the Islamic Consultative Assembly
 The history of the parliament in Iran

References

Committees of the Iranian Parliament
Islamic Consultative Assembly